The 2015–16 George Mason Patriots Men's basketball team represented George Mason University during the 2015–16 NCAA Division I men's basketball season. It was the 50th season for the program. The Patriots were led by Dave Paulsen in his first season as head coach of the program following Paul Hewitt's dismissal. They played their home games at EagleBank Arena and were members of the Atlantic 10 Conference. They finished the season 11–21, 5–13 in A-10 play to finish in a tie for 12th place. They lost to Saint Louis in the first round of the Atlantic 10 tournament.

Previous season
The Patriots finished the season with an overall record of 9–22, with a record of 4–14 in the Atlantic 10 regular season for thirteenth-place finish. In the 2015 Atlantic 10 tournament, the Patriots were defeated by Fordham, 71–65 in the first round.

Offseason

Departures

Awards
Atlantic 10 All Rookie Team
 Otis Livingston II

Atlantic 10 Rookie of the Week
 Jaire Grayer - Nov. 22
 DeAndre Abram - Dec. 20, Dec. 27
 Otis Livingston II - Jan. 10, Feb. 7

Roster

Stats

Schedule and results

|-
!colspan=12 style="background:#; color:#;"| Non-conference regular season

|-
!colspan=12 style="background:#;"| Atlantic 10 regular season

|-
!colspan=12 style="background:#;"| Atlantic 10 tournament

Recruiting
The following is a list of players signed for the 2016–17 season:

See also
2015–16 George Mason Patriots women's basketball team

References

George Mason Patriots men's basketball seasons
George Mason
George Mason men's basketball
George Mason